The 2022–23 Bradley Braves men's basketball team represents Bradley University during the 2022–23 NCAA Division I men's basketball season. The Braves, led by eighth-year head coach Brian Wardle, played their home games at Carver Arena in Peoria, Illinois, as members of the Missouri Valley Conference. They finished the regular season 25–9, 16–4 in MVC play to win the regular season championship for the first time since 1996. They defeated Northern Iowa and Indiana State in the MVC tournament before losing to Drake in the championship game. As a regular season champion who did not win their conference tournament, they received an automatic bid to the National Invitation Tournament.

Previous season
The Braves finished the 2021–22 season 17–14, 11–7 in MVC play to finish in fifth place. They lost to Loyola in the quarterfinals of the MVC tournament.

Roster

Schedule and results

|-
! colspan="9" style=| Exhibition

|-
! colspan="9" style=|Regular season

|-
! colspan=12 style=| MVC Tournament

|-
! colspan=12 style=| NIT

|-

References

2022-23
2022–23 Missouri Valley Conference men's basketball season
2022 in sports in Illinois
Bradley